A traffic park or children's traffic park is a park in which children can learn the rules of the road. A traffic park is also called a transportation park or traffic garden or safety village depending on locale.

Traffic parks are frequently created as an attraction within a larger park. In other cases, they are single-use parks and often small in scale. They can be found in urban as well as rural areas.

Children are allowed to use bicycles or pedal-powered cars to navigate the streets and operate according to traffic laws. Sometimes they share a buggy with their parent, who can provide guidance as they circle the park. Typically, traffic parks are scaled-down versions of real street networks, with the lane and street-width proportional to the smaller vehicles. Often they include operating traffic signals and during busy times are even staffed with traffic police.

One of the intentions of the traffic park is to improve awareness of traffic safety among school-aged children. Many traffic parks enable children to gain hands-on experience crossing streets and with bicycle or other pedestrian safety challenges in a highly controlled environment devoid of actual motor vehicles.

Traffic parks exist throughout Asia, Europe, and North America.  Traffic parks in Asia and Europe are focused on traffic safety through pedal-powered vehicles.  In the United States and Canada they use bicycles as well as electric, motorized vehicles.  These North American parks are called safety villages, because of broader emphasis on safety for fire, electrical, food and other educational purposes.

In the United Kingdom parks are called experiential safety and lifeskills centres, with education mainly delivered indoors in life-sized sets. There are 11 in England, two in Scotland, one in Wales and one in Northern Ireland.

Parks
Here are some of the traffic parks around the world.

Australia
 Apex Merriwa Traffic School, Wangaratta, Victoria.
 Buzy Kidz Traffic School, Mill Park, Victoria.
 Camelot Traffic School, Moorabbin, Victoria.
 Casey Safety Village, Cranbourne, Victoria.
 Constable Care Safety School, Maylands, Western Australia.
 Essendon Traffic School, Essendon, Victoria.
 GDF Suez Traffic School, Morwell, Victoria.
 Kew Traffic School, Kew, Victoria.
 SAPOL Road Safety Centre, Thebarton Police Barracks, Adelaide, South Australia. Prior to this, it was located down the road, but was closed to make way for the new Royal Adelaide Hospital

Belgium
 Mechelen

Canada
 Chilliawak, British Columbia.
 Victoria, British Columbia. Vancouver Island Tom Thumb mobile safety village.
 Belleville, Ontario
 Chatham, Ontario
 Durham, Ontario
 Lambton, Ontario
 London, Ontario
 Niagara, Ontario
 Ottawa, Ontario (Opened in 1972, flooded in 2006, closed in 2007 and demolished in 2010. Rebuilding efforts are currently underway)
 Peel, Ontario
 Waterloo, Ontario
 Windsor, Ontario
 York, Ontario

Czech Republic
In the Czech Republic, there is over 150 traffic parks, that are permanently situated in nearly every town or city of population over 20 000. There is also the concept of "moving" parks that are transported from place to place.
 Prosek, Prague 
 Olomouc 
 Velké Meziříčí

Finland
 Lasten liikennekaupunki in Helsinki, Finland. Opened in 20.5.1958 near the Olympic Stadium and it got small traffic lights in the 1960s.
 Kupittaanpuisto park in Turku, Finland.
 Rahtarit-liikennepuisto in Kangasala, Finland.
 Hollihaan liikennepuisto in Oulu, Finland.

France
 Marseille

Germany 

 In Germany traffic parks for bicycles are widespread and a part of school education. The road maps are often found painted on the ground of schoolyards of primary schools and equipped with temporary traffic signs during lessons. In cities, there are often dedicated traffic parks with permanent signs and small traffic lights.

Hong Kong
 Hong Kong Road Safety Town, Sau Mau Ping, Kowloon
 Sha Tin, New Territories
 North Point, Hong Kong Island

Indonesia
 Bandung

Japan
 Fuchu, Tokyo
 Koganei, Tokyo
 Mitaka, Tokyo
 Suginami, Tokyo
 Tama, Tokyo

Russia
 Автоград, St. Petersburg

Netherlands
 Utrecht

Turkey
 Serdivan Belediyesi Trafik Parkı Biggest children traffic park in Asia. Built by Serdivan Municipality. This traffic park is a non-profit organization. There are 20 electric cars, 30 bicycle helmets, 10 bicycles, a classroom for theorical traffic education, a mini-hospital for first-aid education in the park.

United Kingdom
 Milton Keynes
 Safety Central, Lymm

United States
 Frisco, Texas
 Baton Rouge, Louisiana
 Cobb County, Georgia
 Elmhurst, Illinois
 Elyria, Ohio
 Escondido, California
 Huntington, West Virginia
 Mansfield, Ohio
 Pasco County, Florida
 Portsmouth, Virginia
 Temecula, California
 Washington County, Maryland

Chautauqua Children's Safety Education Village
In 2010, New York State's Chautauqua County nears completion of a children's safety education village in the city of Asheville. Portions of the facility are already operational while the park is being finished.

The safety village is a non-profit organization funded by private donations and the sale of naming rights.  Corporate advertising is sold on ten street names, 25 electric cars, 100 bicycle helmets, 25 bicycles, 28 buildings, as well as in classrooms and even within the curriculum.  As of 2007, rights had been purchased by Sam's Club, Walmart, Tim Hortons, E. E. Austin & Son,

The Chautauqua safety village "the fundamentals of street safety, railway crossing, sign recognition, pedestrian crossing, bicycle safety, 911 usages, and many other safety-related subjects."

The village was inspired when the local American Legion post visited Waterloo, Canada in 1995 and observed the safety village there.

References

External links

 "Safety Town" in Guernica, including temporary traffic parks to teach safety

Playgrounds